The 2022 Teqball World Championships was the 5th edition of the Teqball World Championships. It was held in Nuremberg, Germany from 23 to 27 November 2022. 211 athletes from 55 nations was set to compete in all five categories: men's and women's singles and doubles, and mixed doubles.

Medal summary

Medal table

References

External links 
Website

Teqball
Sports competitions in Nuremberg
Teqball World Championships